Fearnley-Whittingstall is a surname. Notable people with this name include:

 Hugh Fearnley-Whittingstall (born 1965), British chef and food campaigner best known for the River Cottage TV series and brand
 Jane Fearnley-Whittingstall (born 1939), British garden designer, mother of Hugh
Eileen Bennett Whittingstall (1907–1979), also known as Eileen Fearnley Whittingstall, British tennis player
 Edmund Owen Fearnley-Whittingstall (1901–1971), portrait artist and husband of Eileen
Edmund Fearnley Whittingstall, owner in 1838–1856 of Langleybury House, Hertfordshire, England

See also
 Fearnley (surname) 
 Whittingstall (disambiguation)

Compound surnames